Paul Capdeville, the defending champion, defeated Kevin Anderson 7–6(7), 7–6(11) in the final.

Seeds

Draw

Final four

Top half

Bottom half

References
 Main Draw
 Qualifying Draw

Singles